Caversham Heights is an electoral ward of the Borough of Reading, in the English county of Berkshire. The ward was created by a boundary reorganisation prior to the 2022 Reading Borough Council election, and has replaced the Mapledurham ward, with the addition of parts of the old Thames and Peppard wards. During the reorganisation process, the ward was known as The Heights, but the name was subsequent changed as a result of public consultation.

The ward lies in Caversham, once a separate town to the north of the River Thames, and includes the area known as Caversham Heights, together with other parts of the larger area of Caversham. From the south in clockwise order it is bounded by the River Thames, the borough boundary to the west and north, Highdown Hill Road, St Barnabas Road, Evesham Road, Rotherfield Way, Oakley Road, Kidmore Road, The Mount, and The Warren back to the River Thames. The ward is bordered, in the same order, by Mapledurham and Kidmore End civil parishes of Oxfordshire, followed by Emmer Green, Caversham, new Thames, Battle, and Kentwood wards. It is entirely within the Reading East parliamentary constituency.

As with all Reading wards, the ward elects three councillors to Reading Borough Council.  Elections since 2004 are generally held by thirds, with elections in three years out of four, although the 2022 elections were for all councillors due to the boundary changes. The ward councillors are currently Isobel Ballsdon and Paul Carnell, both members of the Conservative party, and Sue Kitchingham, of the Labour party.

2022 election result

References

Wards of Reading